Bessie, better known as Hellcow, is a fictional character appearing in American comic books published by Marvel Comics. The character, a vampire cow, was created by writer Steve Gerber and artist Frank Brunner. She made her first appearance in Giant-Size Man-Thing #5 (1975).

Publication history
Bessie, or Hellcow, made her official debut in Giant-Size Man-Thing #5, published in August 1975. The creative team in charge of the issue comprised writer Steve Gerber, penciller Frank Brunner, and inker Tom Palmer. The same story is reprinted in the bonus pages of Silver Surfer vs. Dracula (February 1994). The character reappeared in April 2011's Deadpool Team-Up #885, written by Rick Spears, pencilled by Phillip Bond and inked by Daniel Brown.

Fictional character biography
Circa 1675, Bessie, a domesticated cow living in a Swiss farm, becomes the prey of Count Dracula, who is unable to find any available humans to feed on. Bessie seemingly dies and an upset Hans, her owner, lays her to rest. Unbeknownst to Hans, Bessie has become an undead monster known as Hellcow, and rises from her grave some three nights later, in search of Dracula to take revenge on him.

In the present day, Howard the Duck is investigating the deaths of four farmers in Cleveland, Ohio. Howard initially concludes that the perpetrator must be a chicken. Later, in the wee hours of the morning, he disguises himself as a human. Hellcow notices him and lunges for him. A scuffle commences and Howard prevails, driving a stake through her heart and apparently ending her reign of terror.

However, Hellcow did not die; her head was still intact. Her corpse is recovered by insane scientist Doctor Kilgore. Reviving her, Kilgore imprisons Hellcow and collects her "vampiric milk", which he believes he can exploit to cure his tuberculosis as well as attain immortality. When this plan does not fully work, Kilgore abducts Deadpool and extracts his hypophysis. Kilgore digests it, so as to give himself the power of self-healing that Deadpool has.

However, the mixture of Hellcow's milk and Deadpool's gland in Kilgore's body goes awry, driving him even more crazy. The vampire cow and the mercenary join forces; Hellcow turns Deadpool into a vampire temporarily and together they rid Kilgore from the world permanently. Deadpool and Hellcow escape from Kilgore's abode but the latter is instantly burnt to a crisp as it is daytime. Deadpool travels back to the previous comic book panel and after a few tries, saves Hellcow from dying and thus "reviving" her.

Hellcow appeared in Spider-Man/Deadpool as a member of Deadpool Inc., a group of odd characters Deadpool's recruited to steal and sell abandoned S.H.I.E.L.D. technology. She can now inexplicably walk upright, has a mostly human figure (barring her head), and can talk.

Powers and abilities
Before becoming a vampire, Bessie could produce more milk than the average cow and hence was well-favored by her owner. As Hellcow, she possesses characteristics tantamount to that of Dracula's, such as being able to suck blood from humans and being immortal. She could transform into a half-cow, half-bat form, enabling her to fly, and she could also disappear into nothingness by taking up the form of gas. She also had superbovine strength and agility.

Reception
In August 2009, Time listed Hellcow as one of the "Top 10 Oddest Marvel Characters". Similarly, Status Magazine included Hellcow in its list of "Top 5 Weirdest Marvel Characters" in April 2012. Bjarki Dagur of Filmophilia found Hellcow to be either "the worst idea for a character I have ever heard, or the greatest thing that has ever existed" in his 2012 article "Best/Worst: Marvel Heroes That Should/Should Never Get Movies".

In 2022, CBR.com ranked Hell Cow 7th in their "10 Most Important Marvel Vampires" list.

In other media

Video games
Hellcow appears as a playable character in Lego Marvel Super Heroes 2.

References

External links

 

Characters created by Steve Gerber
Comics characters introduced in 1975
Fictional cattle
Marvel Comics animals
Marvel Comics characters who are shapeshifters
Marvel Comics characters with superhuman strength
Marvel Comics female characters
Marvel Comics vampires